TSS Slieve More was a twin screw steamer passenger vessel operated by the London, Midland and Scottish Railway from 1930 to 1948, and the British Transport Commission from 1948 to 1965.

History

She was built by William Denny and Brothers of Dumbarton and launched in 1932.

References

1932 ships
Passenger ships of the United Kingdom
Steamships
Ships built on the River Clyde
Ships of the London, Midland and Scottish Railway